Ambilocal residence (or ambilocality), also called bilocal residence (bilocality) is the societal postmarital residence in which couples, upon marriage, choose to live with or near either spouse's parents. This is contrasted with matrilocality and patrilocality, where the newlyweds are expected to live with either the wife's parents or the husband's parents respectively.

References

Bibliography

 Korotayev, Andrey. 2001. An Apologia of George Peter Murdock. Division of Labor by Gender and Postmarital Residence in Cross-Cultural Perspective: A Reconsideration. World Cultures 12(2): 179-203.

Marriage
Sociobiology
Cultural anthropology